Corso may refer to:

 Corso (surname)
 Corso, Boumerdès, a commune in Boumerdès Province, Algeria
 Council of Organisations for Relief Service Overseas, see Jenny Gill
 Via del Corso, a main street in Rome
 "CORSO," a song by rapper Tyler, the Creator

See also
 Cane Corso, a breed of dog